Unni Olsbye (born 9 March 1964) is a Norwegian chemist. A professor at the University of Oslo, she has specialized in catalysts for the petrochemical industry.

Career
Born in Hamar, Olsbye graduated in industrial chemistry from the Norwegian Institute of Technology in 1987, and as dr.scient. in organic chemistry from the University of Oslo in 1991. She was appointed professor at the Department of Chemistry at the University of Oslo in 2002. Her research focus has been catalytic reaction mechanisms in the petrochemical industry.

Olsbye was elected member of the learned society, Norwegian Academy of Technological Sciences from 2009, and member of the Norwegian Academy of Science and Letters from 2015.

References

1964 births
Living people
People from Hamar
Norwegian chemists
Norwegian Institute of Technology alumni
University of Oslo alumni
Academic staff of the University of Oslo
Members of the Norwegian Academy of Technological Sciences
Members of the Norwegian Academy of Science and Letters